Mantorovo, Penza Oblast is a rural village (деревня, derevnya) and a subject of the Russian Federation (see inhabited localities in Russia). Population:

References

Notes

Sources

Rural localities in Penza Oblast